Hwang Byeong-gwan (1919–1952) was a South Korean wrestler. He competed in the men's freestyle welterweight at the 1948 Summer Olympics.

References

External links
 

1919 births
1952 deaths
South Korean male sport wrestlers
Olympic wrestlers of South Korea
Wrestlers at the 1948 Summer Olympics
Changwon Hwang clan
20th-century South Korean people